Agonopterix is a moth genus of the superfamily Gelechioidea. It is placed in the family Depressariidae, which was often – particularly in older treatments – considered a subfamily of the Oecophoridae or included in the Elachistidae.

Species

Agonopterix abditella Hannemann, 1959
Agonopterix abjectella Christoph, 1882
Agonopterix acuta (Stringer, 1930)
Agonopterix acutivalvula S.X. Wang, 2007
Agonopterix adspersella (Kollar, 1832)
Agonopterix agyrella (Rebel, 1917)
Agonopterix alpigena (Frey, 1870)
Agonopterix alstromeriana (Clerck, 1759) – poison hemlock moth
Agonopterix amissella (Busck, 1908)
Agonopterix amyrisella (Busck, 1900)
Agonopterix angelicella (Hubner, 1813)
Agonopterix antennariella Clarke, 1941
Agonopterix anticella (Erschoff, [1877])
Agonopterix aperta Hannemann, 1959
Agonopterix archangelicella (Caradja, 1920)
Agonopterix arctica (Strand, 1902)
Agonopterix arenella (Denis & Schiffermuller, 1775)
Agonopterix argillacea (Walsingham, 1881)
Agonopterix arnicella (Walsingham, 1881)
Agonopterix aspersella (Constant, 1888)
Agonopterix assimilella (Treitschke, 1832)
Agonopterix astrantiae (Heinemann, 1870)
Agonopterix atomella (Denis & Schiffermuller, 1775)
Agonopterix atrodorsella (Clemens, 1863)
Agonopterix babaella Amsel, 1972
Agonopterix bakriella (Amsel, 1958)
Agonopterix baleni (Zeller, 1877)
Agonopterix banatica Georgesco, 1965
Agonopterix bipunctifera (Matsumura, 1931)
Agonopterix bipunctosa (Curtis, 1850)
Agonopterix broennoeensis (Strand, 1920)
Agonopterix budashkini Lvovsky, 1998
Agonopterix burmana (Lvovsky, 1998)
Agonopterix cachritis (Staudinger, 1859)
Agonopterix cadurciella (Chretien, 1914)
Agonopterix cajonensis Clarke, 1941
Agonopterix canadensis (Busck, 1902) – Canadian agonopterix moth
Agonopterix canuflavella (Hannemann, 1953)
Agonopterix capreolella (Zeller, 1839)
Agonopterix carduella (Hubner, 1817)
Agonopterix caucasiella Karsholt et al., 2006
Agonopterix cervariella (Constant, 1884)
Agonopterix chaetosoma Clarke, 1962
Agonopterix chironiella (Constant, 1893)
Agonopterix chrautis Hodges, 1974
Agonopterix ciliella (Stainton, 1849)
Agonopterix cinerariae Walsingham, 1908
Agonopterix clarkei Keifer, 1936
Agonopterix clemensella (Chambers, 1876)
Agonopterix cluniana Huemer & Lvovsky, 2000
Agonopterix cnicella (Treitschke, 1832)
Agonopterix coenosella Zerny, 1940
Agonopterix comitella (Lederer, 1855)
Agonopterix communis (Meyrick, 1920)
Agonopterix compacta (Meyrick, 1914)
Agonopterix conterminella (Zeller, 1839)
Agonopterix costaemaculella (Christoph, 1882)
Agonopterix costimacula Clarke, 1941
Agonopterix crassiventrella (Rebel, 1891)
Agonopterix cratia Hodges, 1974
Agonopterix crypsicosma (Meyrick, 1920)
Agonopterix cuillerella Amsel, 1972
Agonopterix curvilineella (Beutenmüller, 1889) – curved-line agonopterix moth
Agonopterix curvipunctosa (Haworth, 1811)
Agonopterix cyclas (Meyrick, 1910)
Agonopterix cynarivora Meyrick, 1932
Agonopterix cyrniella (Rebel, 1929)
Agonopterix dammersi Clarke, 1947
Agonopterix demissella (Hannemann, 1958)
Agonopterix deliciosella Turati, 1924
Agonopterix deltopa (Meyrick, 1935)
Agonopterix dideganella Amsel, 1972
Agonopterix dierli Lvovsky, 2011
Agonopterix dilatata S.X. Wang, 2007
Agonopterix dimorphella Clarke, 1941
Agonopterix divergella (Caradja, 1920)
Agonopterix doronicella (Wocke, 1849)
Agonopterix dryocrates (Meyrick, 1921)
Agonopterix dubatolovi Lvovsky, 1995
Agonopterix dumitrescui Georgesco, 1965
Agonopterix echinopella (Chrétien, 1907)
Agonopterix elbursella Hannemann, 1976
Agonopterix encentra (Meyrick, 1914)
Agonopterix epichersa (Meyrick, 1914)
Agonopterix erythrella (Snellen, 1884)
Agonopterix eupatoriiella (Chambers, 1878)
Agonopterix exquisitella (Caradja, 1920)
Agonopterix farsensis Hannemann, 1958
Agonopterix ferocella (Chretien, 1910)
Agonopterix ferulae (Zeller, 1847)
Agonopterix flavicomella (Engel, 1907)
Agonopterix flurii Sonderegger, 2013
Agonopterix fruticosella (Walsingham, 1903)
Agonopterix furvella (Treitschke, 1832)
Agonopterix fusciterminella Clarke, 1941
Agonopterix fuscovenella (Rebel, 1917)
Agonopterix galbella Hannemann, 1959
Agonopterix gelidella (Busck, 1908)
Agonopterix glabrella (Turati, 1921)
Agonopterix glyphidopa (Meyrick, 1828)
Agonopterix goughi (Bradley, 1958)
Agonopterix graecella Hannemann, 1976
Agonopterix grammatopa (Meyrick, 1920)
Agonopterix hamriella (Chrétien, 1922)
Agonopterix heracliana (Linnaeus, 1758)
Agonopterix hesphoea Hodges, 1975
Agonopterix hippomarathri (Nickerl, 1864)
Agonopterix hoenei Lvovsky & S.X. Wang, 2011
Agonopterix homogenes (Meyrick, 1920)
Agonopterix hyperella Ely, 1910
Agonopterix hypericella (Hubner, 1817)
Agonopterix iharai Fujisawa, 1985
Agonopterix iliensis (Rebel, 1936)
Agonopterix inoxiella Hannemann, 1959
Agonopterix intersecta (Filipjev, 1929)
Agonopterix invenustella (Hannemann, 1953)
Agonopterix irrorata (Staudinger, 1870)
Agonopterix issikii Clarke, 1962
Agonopterix japonica Saito, 1980
Agonopterix jezonica (Matsumura, 1931)
Agonopterix kaekeritziana (Linnaeus, 1767)
Agonopterix kisojiana Fujisawa, 1985
Agonopterix kuznetzovi Lvovsky, 1983
Agonopterix lacteella (Caradja, 1920)
Agonopterix laterella (Denis & Schiffermuller, 1775)
Agonopterix latipalpella Barnes & Busck, 1920
Agonopterix latipennella Zerny, 1934
Agonopterix lecontella (Clemens, 1860)
Agonopterix leptopa (Diakonoff, 1952)
Agonopterix leucadensis (Rebel, 1932)
Agonopterix liesella Viette, 1987
Agonopterix ligusticella (Chretien, 1908)
Agonopterix likiangella Lvovsky & S.X. Wang, 2011
Agonopterix liturosa (Haworth, 1811)
Agonopterix l-nigrum (Matsumura, 1931)
Agonopterix lythrella (Walsingham, 1889)
Agonopterix malaisei (Diakonoff, 1952)
Agonopterix melanarcha (Meyrick, 1913)
Agonopterix melancholica (Rebel, 1917)
Agonopterix mendesi Corley, 2002
Agonopterix metamelopa Meyrick, 1931
Agonopterix mikkolai Lvovsky, 2011
Agonopterix mikomoensis Fujisawa, 1985
Agonopterix miyanella Amsel, 1972
Agonopterix monotona Caradja, 1927
Agonopterix multiplicella (Erschoff, 1877)
Agonopterix muricolorella (Busck, 1902)
Agonopterix mutatella Hannemann, 1989
Agonopterix mutuurai Saito, 1980
Agonopterix nanatella (Stainton, 1849)
Agonopterix nebulosa (Zeller, 1873)
Agonopterix neoxesta (Meyrick, 1918)
Agonopterix nervosa (Haworth, 1811) – gorse tip moth
Agonopterix nigrinotella (Busck, 1908)
Agonopterix nodiflorella (Milliere, 1866)
Agonopterix nubiferella (Walsingham, 1881)
Agonopterix nyctalopis (Meyrick, 1930)
Agonopterix occaecata (Meyrick, 1922)
Agonopterix ocellana (Fabricius, 1775)
Agonopterix ochrocephala Saito, 1980
Agonopterix oinochroa (Turati, 1879)
Agonopterix omelkoi Lvovsky, 1985
Agonopterix ordubadensis Hannemann, 1959
Agonopterix oregonensis Clarke, 1941
Agonopterix orientalis S.X. Wang, 2007
Agonopterix pallidior (Stringer, 1930)
Agonopterix pallorella (Zeller, 1839)
Agonopterix panjaoella Amsel, 1972
Agonopterix parilella (Treitschke, 1835)
Agonopterix parinkini Lvovsky, 2011
Agonopterix paulae Harrison, 2005
Agonopterix pavida (Meyrick, 1913)
Agonopterix perezi Walsingham, 1908
Agonopterix pergandeella (Busck, 1908)
Agonopterix perstrigella (Chretien, 1925)
Agonopterix petasitis (Standfuss, 1851)
Agonopterix petraea (Meyrick, 1910)
Agonopterix phaeocausta (Meyrick, 1934)
Agonopterix posticella (Walsingham, 1881)
Agonopterix probella (Hannemann, 1953)
Agonopterix propinquella (Treitschke, 1835)
Agonopterix pseudorutana Turati, 1934
Agonopterix psoraliella (Walsingham, 1881)
Agonopterix pteleae Barnes & Busck, 1920
Agonopterix pullella Hannemann, 1971
Agonopterix pulvipennella (Clemens, 1864)
Agonopterix pupillana (Wocke, 1887)
Agonopterix purpurea (Haworth, 1811)
Agonopterix putridella (Denis & Schiffermuller, 1775)
Agonopterix quadripunctata (Wocke, 1857)
Agonopterix ramosella Stainton, 1867
Agonopterix remota (Meyrick, 1921)
Agonopterix rhododrosa (Meyrick, 1934)
Agonopterix rhodogastra Meyrick, 1935
Agonopterix rimulella Caradja, 1920
Agonopterix robiniella (Packard, 1869) – four-dotted agonopterix moth
Agonopterix rosaciliella (Busck, 1904)
Agonopterix roseocaudella Stringer, 1930
Agonopterix rotundella (Douglas, 1846)
Agonopterix rubristricta (Walsingham, 1912)
Agonopterix rubrovittella Caradja, 1926
Agonopterix rutana (Fabricius, 1794)
Agonopterix sabulella (Walsingham, 1881)
Agonopterix salangella Amsel, 1972
Agonopterix sanguinella (Busck, 1902)
Agonopterix sapporensis (Matsumura, 1931)
Agonopterix scopariella (Heinemann, 1870)
Agonopterix selini (Heinemann, 1870)
Agonopterix senecionis (Nickerl, 1864)
Agonopterix seneciovora Fujisawa, 1985
Agonopterix senicionella (Busck, 1902)
Agonopterix septicella Snellen, 1884
Agonopterix seraphimella (Lhomme, 1929)
Agonopterix silerella (Stainton, 1865)
Agonopterix socerbi Šumpich, 2012
Agonopterix squamosa (Mann, 1864)
Agonopterix stigmella (Moore, 1878)
Agonopterix straminella (Staudinger, 1859)
Agonopterix subpropinquella (Stainton, 1849)
Agonopterix subumbellana Hannemann, 1959
Agonopterix sumizome Fujisawa, 1985
Agonopterix sutschanella Caradja, 1926
Agonopterix tabghaella Amsel, 1953
Agonopterix taciturna (Meyrick, 1910)
Agonopterix takamukui (Matsumura, 1931)
Agonopterix thaiensis Hannemann, 1986
Agonopterix thapsiella (Zeller, 1847)
Agonopterix thelmae Clarke, 1941 – Thelma's agonopterix moth
Agonopterix thurneri (Rebel, 1941)
Agonopterix tibetana S.X. Wang, 2007
Agonopterix toega Hodges, 1974
Agonopterix tolli Hannemann, 1959
Agonopterix triallactis Meyrick, 1935
Agonopterix trimenella (Walsingham, 1881)
Agonopterix tschorbadjiewi (Rebel, 1916)
Agonopterix umbellana (Fabricius, 1794)
Agonopterix vasta Amsel, 1935
Agonopterix vendettella (Chretien, 1908)
Agonopterix ventrangulata Lvovsky & S.X. Wang, 2011
Agonopterix vietnamella Lvovsky, 2013
Agonopterix walsinghamella (Busck, 1902) – Walsingham's agonopterix moth
Agonopterix xylinopis Caradja, 1931
Agonopterix yamatoensis Fujisawa, 1985
Agonopterix yeatiana (Fabricius, 1781)
Agonopterix yomogiella Saito, 1980

Former species
Agonopterix acerbella (Walker, 1864)

Footnotes

References
  (2009): Agonopterix.
  (2004): Butterflies and Moths of the World, Generic Names and their Type-species
  (2009): Markku Savela's Lepidoptera and some other life forms – Agonopterix. Version of 2008-JUL-18. Retrieved 2011-SEP-28.
 , 1985: On eight species of the genus Agonopterix Hübner (Lepidoptera: Oecophoridae) from Japan, with descriptions of six new species. Tinea 12 (Part 5): 33-40.
 , 1959: Neue Depressarien aus der Sammlung S. TOLL (Oecophoridae). Deutsche Entomologische Zeitschrift,  Neue Folge 6: 34-43.
 , 1988: Studien an Depressarien (Lep. Oecophoridae). Deutsche Entomologische Zeitschrift 35(1-3): 193-197. Abstract: .
 , 1989: Studien an Depressarien (Lep., Oecophoridae). Deutsche Entomologische Zeitschrift,  36(4/5): 389-399.
 , 1989: Agonopterix multiplicella Erschoff, 1877 (Lep., Oecophoridae). Deutsche Entomologische Zeitschrift 36(1-3): 157-159. Abstract: .
  1825: Verz. bekannt. Schmett., 26: 410. 
 , 2006: A new species of Agonopterix feeding on giant hogweed (Heracleum mantegazzianum) in the Caucasus, with a discussion of the nomenclature of A. heracliana (Linnaeus) (Depressariidae). Nota Lepidopterologica, 28(3/4): 177-192.
  2011: Three new species of the genus Agonopterix (Lepidoptera: Depressariidae) from Nepal. Zoosystematica rossica, 20(1): 149-152. Full article (PDF) 
 ;  2011: Five species of the genus Agonopterix Hübner (Lepidoptera: Depressariidae) from China. 3053: 63-68.
  2007: Genus Agonopterix Hübner (Lepidoptera: Elachistidae: Depressariinae) from China with descriptions of four new species. Entomotaxonomia, 29(3): 215-222. Abstract:

External links
Revised Checklist of Elachistidae in America north of Mexico
Agonopterix at Japanese Moths
African Moths
Taxonomic Study of the Genus Agonopterix from China (Lepidoptera: Elachistidae: Depressariinae)

 
Depressariinae
Moth genera
Taxa named by Jacob Hübner